Réseau des sports (RDS)  is a French Canadian cable specialty channel that broadcasts National Hockey League games.

Background
In 2003, the Montreal Canadiens announced a deal to license its French-language broadcast rights for all of its preseason, season, and playoff games to RDS. This was controversial as it threatened the longest-running television show in Quebec, Radio-Canada's La Soirée du hockey. Days later, an agreement was reached whereby RDS and Radio-Canada would simultaneously broadcast Canadiens games on Saturday nights, saving the show. Within the province of Quebec, this arrangement stopped after the 2003–04 NHL season, and French-language Canadiens broadcasts now air only on RDS. Simulcasted coverage continued in regions that do not receive RDS on analog TV (all of Canada south/west of the Ottawa Region) on Radio-Canada until the 2006–07 NHL season. In addition to Canadiens games, RDS also televised a smaller package of Ottawa Senators games, which appear on either RDS or RDS Info as well as other games. RDS also had the French-language rights to the Stanley Cup playoffs and Finals through 2014, regardless of which teams participated.
 
The NHL game broadcasts formerly varied in name depending on the day of the week. Saturday games were known as Le Hockey du Samedi Soir Coors Light (Coors Light Saturday Night Hockey). Tuesday games were known as Les Méchants Mardis Molson-Ex while all of the other day or night games were known as Le Hockey Subway des Canadiens (Subway Canadiens Hockey). NHL telecasts not involving the Canadiens were simply titled Le hockey Bud Light de la LNH (Bud Light NHL Hockey). Since 2014, games have been known as Le hockey des Canadiens (Bell/Coca-Cola/McDonald's). (Bell/Coca-Cola/McDonald's Canadiens Hockey). The sponsor affiliations change from time to time.

Contract details
At the end of July 2007, RDS and the Montreal Canadiens extended their exclusive broadcasting rights contract through 2013. The deal included all of the Canadiens' 82 regular season games and all of their playoff games, if need be (none of this precludes CBC Sports from televising games in English as part of Hockey Night in Canada). Also, RDS had exclusive rights to French television broadcasting rights for the NHL All-Star Game and Skills Competition, as well as one NHL game per week that did not involve the Canadiens and a minimum of 40 playoff games for either RDS or RDS Info. The Canadiens also granted RDS exclusive rights to 'new media' coverage for the team (i.e., cell-phone TV, podcast and others).

Most other broadcast contracts were acquired through TSN and ESPN.

On November 26, 2013, Rogers Communications, the parent company of Sportsnet announced that it had reached a 12-year, $5.2 billion deal to become the exclusive national rightsholder for the National Hockey League, beginning in the 2014-15 season, and would sub-license exclusive French-language rights to TVA and TVA Sports, replacing RDS. Previously, due to RDS's position as national French rightsholder, the Canadiens forwent a separate regional rights deal and allowed its games to be part of the national French package. Under the new contract, RDS maintained its broadcast rights to 40 Canadiens games per season under a 12-year deal, but Canadiens games are now subject to blackout outside of the Canadiens home market region. In January 2014, as part of a wider media rights deal with Bell Media, RDS also obtained regional broadcast rights to the Ottawa Senators, with 40 regional games in French per season. The contract also includes English-language television and radio rights for TSN and CFGO.

Theme music
In June 2008, RDS's parent, CTV Inc., acquired the rights to "The Hockey Theme" after the CBC decided not to renew its rights to the theme song. A re-orchestrated version of the tune, which has been the theme song of  La Soirée du hockey and Hockey Night in Canada since 1968, will be used for hockey broadcasts on RDS and TSN beginning in the fall of 2008.

Commentators

Current
David Arsenault - Ottawa Senators host
Andrée-Anne Barbeau - Ottawa Senators host
Benoît Brunet - Montreal Canadiens studio analyst
Guy Carbonneau - Montreal Canadiens studio analyst
Alain Crête - Montreal Canadiens host
Vincent Damphousse - Montreal Canadiens studio analyst
Marc Denis - Montreal Canadiens colour commentator
Norman Flynn - Ottawa Senators colour commentator
Denis Gauthier - Ottawa / Montreal Studio analyst
Luc Gélinas - Montreal Canadiens beat reporter
Bruno Gervais - Ottawa / Montreal Studio analyst
Pierre Houde - Montreal Canadiens play-by-play
Michel Y. Lacroix - Ottawa Senators play-by-play
Jocelyn Lemieux - Ottawa Senators studio Analyst
Chantal Machabée - Montreal Canadiens beat reporter
Mario Tremblay - Montreal Canadiens studio analyst

Former
Michel Bergeron - Montreal Canadiens analyst (2008–2010)
Jöel Bouchard - Montreal Canadiens studio analyst/rinkside reporter
Yanick Bouchard - Le Hockey Bud Light de la LNH host
Denis Casavant - Play-by-Play
Jacques Demers - Montreal Canadiens analyst (2000–2010)
Bob Hartley - Ottawa Senators colour commentator/Le Hockey Bud Light de la LNH analyst (2008–2010)
Renaud Lavoie - Montreal Canadiens interviewer
Patrick Lalime - Le Hockey Bud Light de la LNH/Ottawa Senators Analyst
Claude Mailhot - Ottawa Senators studio host
Dave Morissette - Ottawa Senators analyst
Sylvain Pedneault - Montreal Canadiens player profiler
Yvon Pedneault - Montreal Canadiens colour commentator (1998–2008)
Félix Séguin - Le Hockey Bud Light de la LNH play-by-play

References

External links
RDS - Hockey 
RDS - Hockey 

National Hockey League on television
Television shows filmed in Montreal
2003 Canadian television series debuts
2014 Canadian television series endings
2010s Canadian sports television series
2000s Canadian sports television series